Ictinogomphus dobsoni is a species of dragonfly in the family Lindeniidae which was formerly part of the family Gomphidae,
and known as the Pilbara tiger. 
It is a medium to large, black dragonfly with yellow markings and clear wings.
Ictinogomphus dobsoni is endemic to the Pilbara region in Western Australia, where it inhabits rivers, lakes and ponds.

Ictinogomphus dobsoni appears similar to Ictinogomphus australis.

Gallery

See also
 List of Odonata species of Australia

References

Lindeniidae
Odonata of Australia
Insects of Australia
Endemic fauna of Australia
Taxa named by J.A.L. (Tony) Watson
Insects described in 1969